Dominique Lokoli (born 29 January 1952) is a French former professional footballer who played as a defender.

Career
Born in Rouen, Lokoli began his football career at AS Choisy-le-Roi, a club located in the southeastern suburbs of Paris. In 1974, the right-sided defender joined a professional football club at age 22, and would appear in 148 competitive matches during five seasons with Paris Saint-Germain. His teammates gave him the nickname "Bip-Bip", a reference to the Warner Bros. Road Runner, for his pace. He left PSG for Division 1 rivals Nancy, and would finish his career with Auxerre, Reims and Montélimar.

Personal life
Lokoli is the father of French tennis player, Laurent Lokoli.

References

External links

Profile at ASNL.net
Profile at PSG70

1952 births
Living people
Footballers from Rouen
French footballers
French sportspeople of Democratic Republic of the Congo descent
AS Choisy-le-Roi players
Paris Saint-Germain F.C. players
Stade de Reims players
AJ Auxerre players
AS Nancy Lorraine players
Association football defenders
Ligue 1 players
Ligue 2 players
Black French sportspeople